Tommy may refer to:

People
 Tommy (given name)
 Tommy Atkins, or just Tommy, a slang term for a common soldier in the British Army

Arts and entertainment

Film and television
 Tommy (1931 film), a Soviet drama film 
 Tommy (1975 film), a British operetta film based on the Who's album Tommy
 Tommy (2015 film), a Telugu drama film
  Tommy (TV series), a 2020 American drama series

Literature
 Tommy (King poem), by Stephen King, 2010 
 Tommy (Kipling poem), by Rudyard Kipling, 1892

Music 
 Tommy (The Who album), 1969
 Tommy (London Symphony Orchestra album), 1972
 Tommy (soundtrack), a soundtrack to the 1975 film
 The Who's Tommy, a stage production, premiered 1992
 Tommy (The Wedding Present album), 1988
 Tommy (Dosh album), 2010
 Tommy (EP), a 2017 EP by Klein
 Tommy, a 2022 EP by Kiesza
 Tommy, a 1965 album by Tommy Adderley
 Tommy, a 1970 EP by The Who
 "Tommy", a 1991 song by Status Quo from the album Rock 'til You Drop

Other uses in arts and entertainment 
 Tommy, a 1927 play, the basis of the 1930 film She's My Weakness
 Tommy (statue), a statue of a Great War soldier in Seaham, England

Other uses
 Tommy (pigeon), who received the Dickin Medal in 1946 
 British Rail Class 76, an electric locomotive, the prototype of which was named "Tommy"
 Thomson's gazelle, an animal known as a "tommy"
 Quarry Tommy a slate quarry near Cilgerran, Wales

See also 

 Tommie, a masculine given name
 Thompson submachine gun, also known as the "tommy gun"
 Apache TomEE, the Java Enterprise Edition of Apache Tomcat
 Tommy's (charity), associated with St Thomas' Hospital, London
 Tomm (disambiguation)